Moralı Ali Pasha ("Ali Pasha of Morea"; died 1735) was an Ottoman statesman. He was from the Peloponnese, which was historically called Morea.

Ali Pasha served as the Ottoman governor of Anatolia Eyalet (1718–19), Aleppo Eyalet (1719), Sanjak of Candia (Ottoman Crete; 1719–20, 1725, 1726, 1730s), Van Eyalet (1720–21), Mosul Eyalet (1721), Sanjak of Eğriboz (1721–25), Egypt Eyalet (1725–26), Sanjak of Özi (1730–?), and Adana Eyalet (1734–1735).

See also
 List of Ottoman governors of Egypt

References

17th-century births
1735 deaths
17th-century people from the Ottoman Empire
18th-century Ottoman governors of Egypt
People from the Peloponnese
Ottoman governors of Egypt
Ottoman governors of Anatolia
Ottoman governors of Crete
Ottoman governors of Aleppo